Piotrówek may refer to the following places in Poland:
Piotrówek, Legnica County in Lower Silesian Voivodeship (south-west Poland)
Piotrówek, Wrocław County in Lower Silesian Voivodeship (south-west Poland)
Piotrówek, Masovian Voivodeship (east-central Poland)